Vince Vouyer (born John Albert LaForme on June 1, 1966 is a pornographic actor and director. He is sometimes credited as Vince, Vince Voyeur, Vince Voyer, or Vince Voyuer.

Breakin' 'Em In #9 won the AVN Award for Best Pro-Am Release at the 24th Annual AVN Awards Show, hosted by Jessica Drake at the Mandalay Bay Events Center in Las Vegas. The movie also earned Best Anal Sex Scene, Video for Vouyer and Amy Ried.

Awards and nominations
 1997 AVN Award - Best Couples Sex Scene (Conquest) with Jenna Jameson
 1997 AVN Award - Male Performer of the Year
 1997 AVN Award - Best Actor (Video)
 1997 Hot d'Or Award winner - American Best Actor
 1997 AVN Award - Most Outrageous Sex Scene (Shock) with Shayla LaVeaux & T.T. Boy
 1997 AVN Award - Best Group Sex Scene (The Show) with Christy Canyon, Tony Tedeschi & Steven St. Croix
 2007 AVN Award winner - Best Anal Sex Scene, Video (Breakin’ ‘Em In 9 - Vouyer Media) with Amy Ried

Notable TV guest appearances
 The Tera Patrick Show as himself (March 13, 2001)

References

External links
 
 
 
 

American male pornographic film actors
1966 births
Actors from Lowell, Massachusetts
Living people